We're All Going Somewhere is the fifth studio EP by the American Christian rock band Abandon Kansas.  It is the first EP on Gotee Records.

Track listing

References

2009 EPs
Abandon Kansas albums